The Women's Freestyle 59 kg is a competition featured at the 2020 European Wrestling Championships, and was held in Rome, Italy on February 12 and February 13.

Medalists

Results 
 Legend
 F — Won by fall
WO — Won by walkover

Main Bracket

Repechage

References

External links
Bracket

Women's Freestyle 59 kg
2020 in women's sport wrestling